Anarchist economics is the set of theories and practices of economic activity within the political philosophy of anarchism. Many anarchists are anti-authoritarian anti-capitalists, with anarchism usually referred to as a form of libertarian socialism, i.e. a stateless system of socialism. Anarchists support personal property (defined in terms of possession and use, i.e. mutualist usufruct) and oppose capital concentration, interest, monopoly, private ownership of productive property such as the means of production (capital, land and the means of labor), profit, rent, usury and wage slavery which are viewed as inherent to capitalism.

Anarchism is often considered a radical left-wing or far-left movement and much of its economics as well as legal philosophy reflect anti-authoritarian, anti-statist and libertarian interpretations of left-wing and socialist politics such as communism, collectivism, free-market, individualism, mutualism, participism and syndicalism, among other libertarian socialist economics. The majority of anarchist theorists do not consider anarcho-capitalism as a part of the anarchist movement due to the fact that anarchism has historically been an anti-capitalist movement and seen as incompatible with capitalism. Unlike anarcho-capitalists, the free market individualist anarchists retain the labor theory of value and socialist doctrines.

Anarchists argue that characteristic capitalist institutions promote and reproduce various forms of economic activity which they consider oppressive, including private property (as in productive property rather than personal property), hierarchical production relations, collecting rents from private property, taking a profit in exchanges and collecting interest on loans. Anarchists see the ruling class, including capitalists, landlords and all other forms of involuntary, coercive hierarchy, socio-economic rulership and social stratification, as the primary rulers of society, with workers' self-management, democratic education and cooperative housing seen as removing such authority. Unlike right-libertarians, anarchists endorse possession-based ownership rather than propertarianism.

Historical overview

Early views 

The early English anarchist William Godwin's views on economics could be summarized as follows: "[H]e envisages the possibility of specialization in the various crafts, which would lead to a man's following the task for which he had the greatest aptitude, and distributing his surplus products to whoever may need them, receiving what he himself needs of other things from the surplus produced by his neighbours, but always on the basis of free distribution, not of exchange. It is evident that, despite his speculations on the future of machinery, Godwin's ideal society is based on the economics of handcrafts and cultivation".

For the influential German individualist anarchist philosopher Max Stirner, "private property is a spook which "lives by the grace of law" and it "becomes 'mine' only by effect of the law". In other words, private property exists purely "through the protection of the State, through the State's grace". Recognising its need for state protection, Stirner is also aware that "[i]t need not make any difference to the 'good citizens' who protects them and their principles, whether an absolute King or a constitutional one, a republic, if only they are protected. And what is their principle, whose protector they always 'love'? Not that of labour", rather it is "interest-bearing possession [...] labouring capital, therefore [...] labour certainly, yet little or none at all of one's own, but labour of capital and of the – subject labourers".

Pierre-Joseph Proudhon was involved with the Lyons mutualists and later adopted the name to describe his own teachings. In What Is Mutualism?, Clarence Lee Swartz gives his own account of the origin of the term, claiming that "[t]he word "mutualism" seems to have been first used by John Gray, an English writer, in 1832". Proudhon opposed government privilege that protects capitalist, banking and land interests as well as the accumulation or acquisition of property (and any form of coercion that led to it) which he believed hampers competition and keeps wealth in the hands of the few.

Proudhon favoured a right of individuals to retain the product of their labour as their own property, but believed that any property beyond that which an individual produced and could possess was illegitimate. He thus saw private property as both essential to liberty and a road to tyranny, the former when it resulted from labour and was required for labour and the latter when it resulted in exploitation (profit, interest, rent and tax). He generally called the former "possession" and the latter "property". For large-scale industry, he supported workers associations to replace wage labour and opposed the ownership of land.

Josiah Warren is widely regarded as the first American anarchist and the four-page weekly paper he edited during 1833, The Peaceful Revolutionist, was the first anarchist periodical published. Warren termed the phrase "Cost the limit of price", with "cost" here referring not to monetary price paid but the labor one exerted to produce an item. Therefore, "[h]e proposed a system to pay people with certificates indicating how many hours of work they did. They could exchange the notes at local time stores for goods that took the same amount of time to produce".

Warren put his theories to the test by establishing an experimental "labor for labor store" called the Cincinnati Time Store where trade was facilitated by notes backed by a promise to perform labor. The store proved successful and operated for three years after which it was closed so that Warren could pursue establishing colonies based on mutualism. These included Utopia and Modern Times. Warren said that Stephen Pearl Andrews' The Science of Society, published in 1852, was the most lucid and complete exposition of Warren's own theories.

In Europe, an early anarcho-communist was Joseph Déjacque, the first person to describe himself as "libertarian". Unlike and against Proudhon, he argued that "it is not the product of his or her labor that the worker has a right to, but to the satisfaction of his or her needs, whatever may be their nature". Returning to New York, he was able to serialise his book in his periodical Le Libertaire, Journal du Mouvement social. Published in twenty-seven issues from 9 June 1858 to 4 February 1861, Le Libertaire was the first anarcho-communist journal published in the United States.

Economics in organized mass social anarchism 

The anti-authoritarian sections of the First International proclaimed at the St. Imier Congress (1872) that "the aspirations of the proletariat can have no purpose other than the establishment of an absolutely free economic organization and federation, founded upon the labour and equality of all and absolutely independent of all political government" in which each worker will have the "right to the enjoyment of the gross product of his labours and thereby the means of developing his full intellectual, material and moral powers in a collective setting". This revolutionary transformation could "only be the outcome of the spontaneous action of the proletariat itself, its trades bodies and the autonomous communes". Due to its links to active workers' movements, the International became a significant organization. Karl Marx became a leading figure in the International and a member of its General Council. Proudhon's followers, the mutualists, opposed Marx's state socialism, advocating political abstentionism and small property holdings.

In 1868, following their unsuccessful participation in the League of Peace and Freedom (LPF), Russian revolutionary Mikhail Bakunin and his collectivist anarchist associates joined the First International (which had decided not to get involved with the LPF). They allied themselves with the federalist socialist sections of the International, who advocated the revolutionary overthrow of the state and the collectivization of property. A similar position was adopted by the Federation of Workers of the Spanish Region in 1882 as articulated by anarchist veteran of the First International Josep Llunas i Pujals in his essay, "Collectivism". The collectivist anarchists advocated remuneration for the type and amount of labor adhering to the principle "to each according to deeds".

By the early 1880s, most of the European anarchist movement had adopted an anarcho-communist position, advocating the abolition of wage labour and distribution according to need. Ironically, the "collectivist" label then became more commonly associated with Marxist state socialists who advocated the retention of some sort of wage system during the transition to full communism. Anarcho-communist Peter Kropotkin attacked this position in his essay, "The Collectivist Wages System", which was reprinted in his book The Conquest of Bread in 1892. Cafiero explains in Anarchy and Communism (1880) that private property in the product of labor will lead to unequal accumulation of capital and therefore the reappearance of social classes and their antagonisms; and thus the resurrection of the state: "If we preserve the individual appropriation of the products of labour, we would be forced to preserve money, leaving more or less accumulation of wealth according to more or less merit rather than need of individuals". At the Florence Conference of the Italian Federation of the International in 1876, held in a forest outside Florence due to police activity, they declared the principles of anarcho-communism.

Anarchism economics in practice: the Spanish Revolution 

In the strong anarchist movement in Spain, the debate between collectivism and anarcho-communism was revived: "This double base, both industrial and rural, had turned the libertarian communism of Spanish anarcho-syndicalism in somewhat divergent directions, the one communalist, the other syndicalist. The communalism was expressed in a more local, more rural spirit, one might almost say: more southern, for one of its principal bastions was in Andalusia. Syndicalism, on the other hand, was more urban and unitarian in spirit – more northerly, too, since its main center was Catalonia".

Spanish anarchist theoreticians were somewhat divided on this subject. A section of them had given their hearts to Peter Kropotkin and his erudite yet simplistic idealization of the communes of the Middle Ages which they identified with the Spanish tradition of the primitive peasant community. Their favorite slogan was the "free commune". Mikhail Bakunin was the founder of the Spanish collectivist, syndicalist and internationalist workers' movement. Those anarchists tended to follow him and his disciple Ricardo Mella. They were concerned with economic unification and believed that a long transitional period would be necessary during which it would be wiser to reward labor according to the hours worked and not according to need. They envisaged the economic structure of the future as a combination of local trade-union groupings and federations of branches of industry.

In 1932, the Spanish anarchist theoretician Isaac Puente published an outline of anarcho-communism and its ideas were taken up by the Saragossa congress of the Confederación Nacional del Trabajo in May 1936. The Spanish anarchist economist Diego Abad de Santillan published an influential treatise on economics, El Organismo Economico de la Revolucion (The Economic Organization of the Revolution). He saw the following:

Santillan was to play an important part in the Spanish Revolution. He became a member of the central committee of the anti-fascist militia, a member of the Catalan Economic Council and Economics Minister of the Catalan government. Anarchist historian George Woodcock reports the following:

Theoretical economic systems 
In a chronological and theoretical sense, there are classical—those created throughout the 19th century—and post-classical anarchist schools–those created since the mid-20th century and after.

Classical theoretical economic systems

Mutualism 

Mutualism is an anarchist school of thought which can be traced to the writings of Pierre-Joseph Proudhon, who envisioned a society where each person might possess a means of production, either individually or collectively, with trade representing equivalent amounts of labor in the free market. Integral to the scheme was the establishment of a mutual-credit bank which would lend to producers at a minimal interest rate only high enough to cover the costs of administration. Mutualism is based on a labor theory of value which holds that when labor or its product is sold, in exchange it ought to receive goods or services embodying "the amount of labor necessary to produce an article of exactly similar and equal utility".

Some mutualists believe that if the state did not intervene as a result of increased competition in the marketplace, individuals would receive no more income than that in proportion to the amount of labor they exert. Mutualists oppose the idea of individuals receiving an income through loans, investments and rent as they believe these individuals are not laboring. Some of them argue that if state intervention ceased, these types of incomes would disappear due to increased competition in capital.

Although Proudhon opposed this type of income, he expressed: "[...] I never meant to [...] forbid or suppress, by sovereign decree, ground rent and interest on capital. I believe that all these forms of human activity should remain free and optional for all". Insofar as they ensure the workers right to the full product of their labor, mutualists support markets and private property in the product of labor. However, they argue for conditional titles to land, whose private ownership is legitimate only so long as it remains in use or occupation (which Proudhon called "possession").

Proudhon's mutualism supports labor-owned cooperative firms and associations for "we need not hesitate, for we have no choice [...] it is necessary to form an ASSOCIATION among workers [...] because without that, they would remain related as subordinates and superiors, and there would ensue two [...] castes of masters and wage-workers, which is repugnant to a free and democratic society" and so "it becomes necessary for the workers to form themselves into democratic
societies, with equal conditions for all members, on pain of a relapse into feudalism". As for capital goods (man-made, non-land "means of production"), mutualist opinion differs on whether these should be commonly managed public assets or private property.

Evolution 

As a term, "mutualism" has seen a variety of related uses. Charles Fourier first used the French term mutualisme in 1822, although the reference was not to an economic system. The first use of the noun "mutualist" was in the New-Harmony Gazette by an American Owenite in 1826. In the early 1830s, a labor organization in Lyons, France called themselves the Mutuellists. Pierre-Joseph Proudhon was involved with the Lyons mutualists and later adopted the name to describe his own teachings.

In What Is Mutualism?, Clarence Lee Swartz gives his own account of the origin of the term, claiming that "[t]he word "mutualism" seems to have been first used by John Gray, an English writer, in 1832". When John Gray's 1825 Lecture on Human Happiness was first published in the United States in 1826, the publishers appended the Preamble and Constitution of the Friendly Association for Mutual Interests, located at Valley Forge. 1826 also saw the publication of the Constitution of the Friendly Association for Mutual Interests at Kendal, Ohio.

By 1846, Proudhon was speaking of mutualité in his writings and used the term mutuellisme at least as early as 1848 in his "Programme Révolutionnaire". In 1850, William Batchelder Greene used the term "mutualism" to describe a mutual credit system similar to that of Proudhon. Also in 1850, the American newspaper The Spirit of the Age, edited by William Henry Channing, published proposals for a "mutualist township" by Joshua King Ingalls and Albert Brisbane, together with works by Proudhon, Greene, Pierre Leroux and others.

For American anarchist historian Eunice Minette Schuster, "[i]t is apparent...that Proudhonian Anarchism was to be found in the United States at least as early as 1848 and that it was not conscious of its affinity to the Individualist Anarchism of Josiah Warren and Stephen Pearl Andrews...William B. Greene presented this Proudhonian Mutualism in its purest and most systematic form". Later, Benjamin Tucker fused Max Stirner's egoism with the economics of Warren and Proudhon in his eclectic influential publication Liberty. Mutualism has been associated with two types of currency reform. Labor notes were first discussed in Owenite circles and received their first practical test in 1827 in the Time Store of former New Harmony member and individualist anarchist Josiah Warren. Mutual banking aimed at the monetization of all forms of wealth and the extension of free credit. It is most closely associated with William Batchelder Greene, but Greene drew from the work of Proudhon, Edward Kellogg and William Beck as well as from the land bank tradition.

Mutualists argue that association is only necessary where there is an organic combination of forces. For instance, an operation that requires specialization and many different workers performing their individual tasks to complete a unified product, i.e. a factory. In this situation, workers are inherently dependent on each other; and without association, they are related as subordinate and superior, master and wage-slave. An operation that can be performed by an individual without the help of specialized workers does not require association. Proudhon argued that peasants do not require societal form, and only feigned association for the purposes of solidarity in abolishing rents, buying clubs, etc.

Mutualists argue that free banking should be taken back by the people to establish systems of free credit. They contend that banks have a monopoly on credit, just as capitalists have a monopoly on land. Kevin Carson is a contemporary mutualist and author of Studies in Mutualist Political Economy. Carson holds that capitalism has been founded on "an act of robbery as massive as feudalism" and argues that capitalism could not exist in the absence of a state. He says that "[i]t is state intervention that distinguishes capitalism from the free market". As Robert Graham notes, "Proudhon's market socialism is indissolubly linked to his notions of industry democracy and workers' self-management". K. Steven Vincent notes in his in-depth analysis of this aspect of Proudhon's ideas that "Proudhon consistently advanced a program of industrial democracy which would return control and direction of the economy to the workers". For Proudhon, "strong workers' associations [...] would enable the workers to determine jointly by election how the enterprise was to be directed and operated on a day-to-day basis".

Collectivist anarchism 

Collectivist anarchism is a revolutionary doctrine that advocates the abolition of both the state and private ownership of the means of production. Instead, it envisions the means of production being owned collectively and controlled and managed by the producers themselves. For the collectivization of the means of production, it was originally envisaged that workers will revolt and forcibly collectivize the means of production. Once collectivization takes place, workers' salaries would be determined in democratic organizations based on the amount of time they contributed to production. These salaries would be used to purchase goods in a communal market.

This contrasts with anarcho-communism, where wages would be abolished and where individuals would take freely from a storehouse of goods "to each according to his need". Notwithstanding the title, Mikhail Bakunin's collectivist anarchism is thus seen as a blend of individualism and collectivism. Collectivist anarchism is most commonly associated with Bakunin, the anti-authoritarian sections of the First International and the early Spanish anarchist movement.

Criticism of Marxism and relationship with other anarchist classical currents 

The collectivist anarchists at first used the term "collectivism" to distinguish themselves from the mutualism of the followers of Pierre-Joseph Proudhon and the state socialists associated with Karl Marx. Mikhail Bakunin wrote that "we shall always protest against anything that may in any way resemble communism or state socialism", which Bakunin regarded as fundamentally authoritarian ("Federalism, Socialism, and Anti-Theologism", 1867).

The dispute between Bakunin and Marx highlighted the differences between anarchism and Marxism. Bakunin argued—against certain ideas of a number of Marxists—that not all revolutions need be violent. He also strongly rejected Marx's concept of the "dictatorship of the proletariat", a concept that vanguardist socialism including Marxism–Leninism would use to justify one-party rule from above by a party claiming to represent the proletariat. Bakunin insisted that revolutions must be led by the people directly while any "enlightened elite" must only exert influence by remaining "invisible...not imposed on anyone...[and] deprived of all official rights and significance". He held that the state should be immediately abolished because all forms of government eventually lead to oppression. Bakunin has sometimes been called the first theorist of the "new class", meaning that a class of intellectuals and bureaucrats running the state in the name of the people or the proletariat—but in reality in their own interests alone. Bakunin argued that the "[s]tate has always been the patrimony of some privileged class: a priestly class, an aristocratic class, a bourgeois class. And finally, when all the other classes have exhausted themselves, the State then becomes the patrimony of the bureaucratic class and then falls – or, if you will, rises – to the position of a machine". Bakunin also had a different view as compared to Marx's on the revolutionary potential of the lumpenproletariat and the proletariat. As such, "[b]oth agreed that the proletariat would play a key role, but for Marx the proletariat was the exclusive, leading revolutionary agent while Bakunin entertained the possibility that the peasants and even the lumpenproletariat (the unemployed, common criminals, etc.) could rise to the occasion". Bakunin "considers workers' integration in capital as destructive of more primary revolutionary forces. For Bakunin, the revolutionary archetype is found in a peasant milieu (which is presented as having longstanding insurrectionary traditions, as well as a communist archetype in its current social form – the peasant commune) and amongst educated unemployed youth, assorted marginals from all classes, brigands, robbers, the impoverished masses, and those on the margins of society who have escaped, been excluded from, or not yet subsumed in the discipline of emerging industrial work...in short, all those whom Marx sought to include in the category of the lumpenproletariat".

The anti-authoritarian sections of the First International proclaimed at the St. Imier Congress (1872) that "the aspirations of the proletariat can have no purpose other than the establishment of an absolutely free economic organization and federation, founded upon the labour and equality of all and absolutely independent of all political government" in which each worker will have the "right to the enjoyment of the gross product of his labours and thereby the means of developing his full intellectual, material and moral powers in a collective setting". This revolutionary transformation could "only be the outcome of the spontaneous action of the proletariat itself, its trades bodies and the autonomous communes". A similar position was adopted by the Workers' Federation of the Spanish Region in 1882 as articulated by anarchist veteran of the First International Jose Llunas Pujols in his essay, "Collectivism".

The difference between collectivist anarchism and anarcho-communism is that collectivist anarchism stresses collective ownership of productive, subsistence and distributary property while anarcho-communism negates the concept of ownership in favor of usage or possession with productive means being a possession not owned by any individual or particular group. Anarcho-communists believe that subsistence, productive and distributive property should be common or social possessions while personal property should be private possessions. Collectivist anarchists agree with this, but they disagree on the subject of remuneration—some collectivist anarchists, such as Mikhail Bakunin, believe in the remuneration of labor while anarcho-communists such as Peter Kropotkin believe that such remuneration would lead to the recreation of currency and that this would need a state. Thus it could be said that collectivist anarchists believe in freedom through collective ownership of production and a communal market of sorts to distribute goods and services and compensate workers in the form of remuneration. Collectivist anarchism could be seen as a combination of communism and mutualism.

The Anarchist FAQ compares and contrasts collectivist anarchism with communist anarchism this way:

Anarcho-communism 

Anarcho-communism, also known as anarchist communism and occasionally as free communism or libertarian communism, is a theory of anarchism which advocates the abolition of the state, markets, money, capitalism and private property (while retaining respect for personal property) and in favor of common ownership of the means of production, direct democracy and a horizontal network of voluntary associations and workers' councils with production and consumption based on the guiding principle: "From each according to his ability, to each according to his needs". Some forms of anarcho-communism such as insurrectionary anarchism are strongly influenced by egoism and radical individualism, believing anarcho-communism is the best social system for the realization of individual freedom. Most anarcho-communists view anarcho-communism as a way of reconciling the opposition between the individual and society.

The abolition of wage labor is central to anarchist communism. With distribution of wealth being based on self-determined needs, people would be free to engage in whatever activities they found most fulfilling and would no longer have to engage in work for which they have neither the temperament nor the aptitude. Anarcho-communists argue that there is no valid way of measuring the value of any one person's economic contributions because all wealth is a collective product of current and preceding generations.

Anarcho-communists argue that any economic system based on wage labor and private property requires a coercive state apparatus to enforce property rights and to maintain unequal economic relationships that inevitably arise from differences in wages or amount of property. They further argue that markets and systems of currency divide labor into classes and assign arbitrary numerical values to an individual's work and attempt to regulate production, consumption and distribution. They argue that money restricts an individual's ability to consume the products of their labor by limiting their intake with prices and wages.

Anarcho-communists recognize money as fundamentally quantitative in nature, rather than qualitative. They believe production should be a qualitative matter and that consumption and distribution should be self-determined by each individual without arbitrary value assigned to labor, goods and services by others. In place of a market, most anarcho-communists support a currency-less gift economy where goods and services are produced by workers and distributed in community stores where everyone (including the workers who produced them) is essentially entitled to consume whatever they want or need as "payment" for their production of goods and services.

A gift economy does not necessarily involve an immediate return (such as with remuneration) as compensation comes in the form of whatever the person decides is of equal value to their products of labor (what is commonly called bartering). Any limits on production and distribution would be determined by the individuals within the groups involved, rather than by capitalist owners, corporations, investors, banks or other artificial market pressures. Crucially, the abstract relationship of "landlord" and "tenant" would no longer exist as such titles are held to occur under conditional legal coercion and are not absolutely necessary to occupy buildings or spaces (intellectual property rights would also cease since they are a form of private property).

Evolution and role in early 20th century revolutions 

Anarcho-communism developed out of radical socialist currents after the French Revolution, but it was first formulated as such in the Italian section of the First International. An early anarcho-communist was Joseph Déjacque, the first person to describe himself as "libertarian". Unlike Proudhon, he argued that "it is not the product of his or her labor that the worker has a right to, but to the satisfaction of his or her needs, whatever may be their nature".

Anarcho-communism as a coherent, modern economic-political philosophy was first formulated in the Italian section of the First International by Carlo Cafiero, Emilio Covelli, Errico Malatesta, Andrea Costa and other ex Mazzinian republicans. Out of respect for Mikhail Bakunin, they did not make their differences with collectivist anarchism explicit until after Bakunin's death. The collectivist anarchists sought to collectivize ownership of the means of production while retaining payment proportional to the amount and kind of labor of each individual, but the anarcho-communists sought to extend the concept of collective ownership to the products of labor as well.

While both groups argued against capitalism, the anarchist communists departed from Proudhon and Bakunin, who maintained that individuals have a right to the product of their individual labor and to be remunerated for their particular contribution to production. As Malatesta put it, "instead of running the risk of making a confusion in trying to distinguish what you and I each do, let us all work and put everything in common. In this way each will give to society all that his strength permits until enough is produced for every one; and each will take all that he needs, limiting his needs only in those things of which there is not yet plenty for every one". The theoretical work of Peter Kropotkin took importance later as it expanded and developed pro-organizationalist and insurrectionary anti-organizationalist sections.

During the Russian Revolution, anarchists such as Nestor Makhno worked to create and defend anarcho-communism in Ukraine from 1919 before being conquered by the Bolsheviks in 1921. A commander of the peasant Revolutionary Insurgent Army of Ukraine, Makhno led a guerrilla campaign opposing both the Bolshevik "Reds" and monarchist "Whites". The revolutionary autonomous movement of which he was a part made various tactical military pacts while fighting various forces of reaction and organizing the Makhnovshchina, an anarchist society committed to resisting state authority, whether capitalist or Bolshevik.

After successfully repelling Austro-Hungarian, White and Ukrainian nationalist forces, the Makhnovist militia forces and anarcho-communist territories in Ukraine were eventually crushed by Bolshevik military forces. In the Mexican Revolution, the Mexican Liberal Party was established and during the early 1910s led a series of military offensives leading to the conquest and occupation of certain towns and districts in Baja California with the leadership of anarcho-communist Ricardo Flores Magón. Kropotkin's The Conquest of Bread, which Flores Magón considered a kind of anarchist bible, served as basis for the short-lived revolutionary communes in Baja California during the Magónista Revolt of 1911.

To date, the best-known examples of an anarcho-communist society (i.e. established around the ideas as they exist today and achieving worldwide attention and knowledge in the historical canon), are the anarchist territories during the Spanish Revolution and the Makhnovshchina during the Russian Revolution. Through the efforts and influence of the Spanish anarchists during the Spanish Revolution within the Spanish Civil War starting in 1936, anarcho-communism existed in most of Aragon, parts of the Levante and Andalusia as well as in the stronghold of anarchist Catalonia before being crushed by the combined forces of the regime that won the war, Hitler, Mussolini, Spanish Communist Party repression (backed by the Soviet Union) as well as economic and armaments blockades from the capitalist countries and the Spanish Republic itself.

Post-classical theoretical economic systems

Participatory economics 

Participatory economics, often abbreviated parecon, is an economic system proposed by activist and political theorist Michael Albert and radical economist Robin Hahnel. For Albert, "participatory economics and participatory society provide a worthy, viable, and even necessary and potentially sufficient anarchist revolutionary vision". It uses participatory decision making as an economic mechanism to guide the production, consumption and allocation of resources in a given society. Proposed as an alternative to contemporary capitalist market economies and also an alternative to centrally planned socialism, it is described as "an anarchistic economic vision" and it could be considered a form of socialism as under parecon the means of production are owned by the workers.

The underlying values that parecon seeks to implement are equity, solidarity, diversity, workers' self-management and efficiency (efficiency here means accomplishing goals without wasting valued assets). It proposes to attain these ends mainly through the following principles and institutions:
 Workers' and consumers' councils utilizing self-managerial methods for decision making
 Balanced job complexes
 Remuneration according to effort and sacrifice
 Participatory planning

Albert and Hahnel stress that parecon is only meant to address an alternative economic theory and must be accompanied by equally important alternative visions in the fields of politics, culture and kinship. The authors have also discussed elements of anarchism in the field of politics, polyculturalism in the field of culture and feminism in the field of family and gender relations as being possible foundations for future alternative visions in these other spheres of society. Stephen R. Shalom has begun work on a participatory political vision he calls "parpolity".

Free-market anarchism 

Free-market anarchism, based on the economic theories of mutualism and individualist anarchism, is a revival of such free-market anarchist theories. It encompasses diverse economic theories like those proposed by individualist anarchists and libertarian socialists such as the Europeans Émile Armand, Thomas Hodgskin, Miguel Giménez Igualada and Pierre-Joseph Proudhon, or the Americans Stephen Pearl Andrews, William Batchelder Greene, Lysander Spooner, Benjamin Tucker and Josiah Warren, among others; and various anti-capitalists, left-libertarians and left-wing market anarchists such as Kevin Carson, Gary Chartier, Samuel Edward Konkin III, and Chris Matthew Sciabarra.

Anarcho-capitalism advocates the elimination of the public sector in favor of a laissez-faire economic system and is associated with individuals such as David D. Friedman and Murray Rothbard. In an anarcho-capitalist society, law enforcement, courts and all other security services would be funded through the marketplace rather than through confiscatory taxation and money would be privately and competitively provided in an open market. Anarcho-capitalism developed from Austrian School economics, study of law and economics and public choice theory. Since employers are generally categorised as rulers in political sociology and always in anarchist theory, anarchists do not associate anarcho-capitalism with anarchist thought. The belief in the need of a police force, a kind of centralised law enforcement, to prevent crime, whether privatised or not, has been criticised by anarchists as constituting a state since police are a group with a monopoly on force. The majority of anarchist theorists do not consider anarcho-capitalism as a part of the anarchist movement due to the fact that anarchism has historically been an anti-capitalist movement and see it incompatible with capitalism. While inspired by individualist anarchists such as Lysander Spooner and Benjamin Tucker, both espoused mutualism and criticised wage labour. Rothbard argued that individualist anarchism is different from anarcho-capitalism and capitalism because the individualist anarchists retained the labor theory of value and socialist doctrines.

The Really Really Free Market movement is a horizontally organized collective of individuals who form a temporary market based on an alternative gift economy. The movement aims to counteract capitalism in a proactive way by creating a positive example to challenge the myths of scarcity and competition. The name itself is a play on words as it is a reinterpretation and re-envisioning of free market, a term which generally refers to an economy of consumerism governed by supply and demand.

Issues and proposals

Anarchist criticism of capitalism 

The authors of An Anarchist FAQ state that anarchists have long recognised that capitalism is by its very nature hierarchical. The worker is subjected to the authority of the boss during working hours (sometimes outside work too). They state: "This hierarchical control of wage labour has the effect of alienating workers from their own work, and so from themselves. Workers no longer govern themselves during work hours and so are no longer free". So this is why capitalism, "by treating labour as analogous to all other commodities denies the key distinction between labour and other "resources"—that is to say its inseparability from its bearer—labour, unlike other "property", is endowed with will and agency. Thus when one speaks of selling labour there is a necessary subjugation of will (hierarchy)... Creative, self-managed work is a source of pride and joy and part of what it means to be fully human. Wrenching control of work from the hands of the worker profoundly harms his or her mental and physical health". They also establish the following: 

For the influential German individualist anarchist philosopher Max Stirner, "private property is a spook which "lives by the grace of law" and it "becomes 'mine' only by effect of the law". In other words, private property exists purely "through the protection of the State, through the State's grace". Recognising its need for state protection, Stirner is also aware that "[i]t need not make any difference to the 'good citizens' who protects them and their principles, whether an absolute King or a constitutional one, a republic, if only they are protected. And what is their principle, whose protector they always 'love'? Not that of labour", rather it is "interest-bearing possession [...] labouring capital, therefore [...] labour certainly, yet little or none at all of one's own, but labour of capital and of the – subject labourers". French anarchist Pierre-Joseph Proudhon opposed government privilege that protects capitalist, banking and land interests as well as the accumulation or acquisition of property (and any form of coercion that led to it) which he believed hampers competition and keeps wealth in the hands of the few. The Spanish individualist anarchist Miguel Giménez Igualada sees "capitalism is an effect of government; the disappearance of government means capitalism falls from its pedestal vertiginously...That which we call capitalism is not something else but a product of the State, within which the only thing that is being pushed forward is profit, good or badly acquired. And so to fight against capitalism is a pointless task, since be it State capitalism or Enterprise capitalism, as long as Government exists, exploiting capital will exist. The fight, but of consciousness, is against the State".

Within anarchism there emerged a critique of wage slavery which refers to a situation perceived as quasi-voluntary slavery, where a person's livelihood depends on wages, especially when the dependence is total and immediate. It is a negatively connoted term used to draw an analogy between slavery and wage labor by focusing on similarities between owning and renting a person. The term "wage slavery" has been used to criticize economic exploitation and social stratification, with the former seen primarily as unequal bargaining power between labor and capital (particularly when workers are paid comparatively low wages, e.g. in sweatshops), and the latter as a lack of workers' self-management, fulfilling job choices and leisure in an economy. Libertarian socialists believe that if freedom is valued, then society must work towards a system in which individuals have the power to decide economic issues along with political issues. Libertarian socialists seek to replace unjustified authority with direct democracy, voluntary federation and popular autonomy in all aspects of life, including physical communities and economic enterprises. With the advent of the Industrial Revolution, thinkers such as Proudhon and Marx elaborated the comparison between wage labor and slavery in the context of a critique of societal property not intended for active personal use, Luddites emphasized the dehumanization brought about by machines while later Emma Goldman famously denounced wage slavery by saying: "The only difference is that you are hired slaves instead of block slaves". Goldman believed that the economic system of capitalism was incompatible with human liberty. "The only demand that property recognizes", she wrote in Anarchism and Other Essays, "is its own gluttonous appetite for greater wealth, because wealth means power; the power to subdue, to crush, to exploit, the power to enslave, to outrage, to degrade". She also argued that capitalism dehumanized workers, "turning the producer into a mere particle of a machine, with less will and decision than his master of steel and iron".

Noam Chomsky contends that there is little moral difference between chattel slavery and renting one's self to an owner or "wage slavery". He feels that it is an attack on personal integrity that undermines individual freedom. He holds that workers should own and control their workplace. Many libertarian socialists argue that large-scale voluntary associations should manage industrial manufacture while workers retain rights to the individual products of their labor. As such, they see a distinction between the concepts of "private property" and "personal possession". Whereas "private property" grants an individual exclusive control over a thing whether it is in use or not and regardless of its productive capacity, "possession" grants no rights to things that are not in use.

In addition to anarchist Benjamin Tucker's "big four" monopolies (land, money, tariffs and patents) that have emerged under capitalism, neo-mutualist economist Kevin Carson argues that the state has also transferred wealth to the wealthy by subsidizing organizational centralization in the form of transportation and communication subsidies. He believes that Tucker overlooked this issue due to Tucker's focus on individual market transactions whereas Carson also focuses on organizational issues. The theoretical sections of Studies in Mutualist Political Economy are presented as an attempt to integrate marginalist critiques into the labor theory of value. Carson holds that "arising as a new class society directly from the old class society of the Middle Ages, [capitalism] was founded on an act of robbery as massive as the earlier feudal conquest of the land. It has been sustained to the present by continual state intervention to protect its system of privilege without which its survival is unimaginable". Carson coined the pejorative term "vulgar libertarianism", a phrase that describes the use of a free market rhetoric in defense of corporate capitalism and economic inequality (see economic liberalism and right-libertarianism). According to Carson, the term is derived from the phrase "vulgar political economy", which Karl Marx described as an economic order that "deliberately becomes increasingly apologetic and makes strenuous attempts to talk out of existence the ideas which contain the contradictions [existing in economic life]".

Economics as anarchist strategy 

Economic secession has been variously defined by sources. In its narrowest sense, it is abstention from the state's economic system—for instance by replacing the use of government money with barter, local exchange trading systems, or commodity money (such as gold). As such, "anarchists can often be found advocating for mass refusal and the withdrawal of our participation-sometimes in the form of general strikes; sometimes as in the case of the illegalists, in the forms of direct expropriations – with the support and participation of social movements or not; sometimes in the forms of occupations and the taking of space; and still other times in advocating for creating alternatives to capitalist relations in the here and now; and so on".

Some anarchists believe that it is not radical political activity that will transform society, but radical economic activity that will make true change. They regard boycotts, consumer advocacy and class action lawsuits to be merely liberal actions that do not address the core problem which is capitalism itself. Italian anarcho-communist Errico Malatesta argued that "each victory, however small, gained by the workers against their exploiters, each decrease of profit, every bit of wealth taken from the individual owners and put at the disposal of all, shall be a progress – a forward step towards Anarchism".

Participatory economics addresses the division of labor question by advocating balanced job complexes wherein all workers at a production facility share in all aspects of labor, i.e. everyone takes part in labor, management, maintenance and all related work to ensure equality and that skills are shared amongst workers. Some anarchists that changing personal consumption habits to minimize (or eliminate) involvement in the prevailing capitalist economy is essential to practicing anarchism in their lives. Withdrawing from the system by living on scavenged, stolen, or scammed resources is often touted by individuals and groups influenced by the Situationists such as CrimethInc. as a viable means of survival and non-participation in the system.

Anarchist value theory 
Pierre-Joseph Proudhon's mutualism and American individualist anarchists such as Josiah Warren, Lysander Spooner and Benjamin Tucker adopted the liberal labor theory of value of classical economics, but they used it to criticize capitalism—instead favoring a non-capitalist market system.

Egoist anarchist Max Stirner did not adhere to anything close to the labor theory of value and affirmed that the only real base for possession is might over it.

Collectivist anarchism, as defended by Mikhail Bakunin, defended a form of the labour theory of value when it advocated a system where "all necessaries for production are owned in common by the labour groups and the free communes...based on the distribution of goods according to the labour contributed".

Anarcho-communism, as defended by Peter Kropotkin and Errico Malatesta, rejected the labor theory of value and exchange value itself, advocated a gift economy and to base distribution on need.

Ethics of pricing 

Josiah Warren termed the phrase "Cost the limit of price", with "cost" here referring not to monetary price paid but the labor one exerted to produce an item. This understanding of cost is congruent with that of the classical economist Adam Smith who said: "The real price of every thing, what every thing really costs to the man who wants to acquire it, is the toil and trouble of acquiring it". However, Warren reached different conclusions as he believed that goods and services should trade according to how much labor was exerted to produce them and bring them to market, instead of according to how individuals believed them to be subjectively worth. Therefore, "[h]e proposed a system to pay people with certificates indicating how many hours of work they did. They could exchange the notes at local time stores for goods that took the same amount of time to produce". To charge more labor for something that entailed less labor was "cannibalism", according to him. Moreover, he believed that trading according to "cost the limit of price" would promote increasing efficiency in an economy, as he explains in Equitable Commerce: 

He put his theories to the test by establishing an experimental "labor for labor store" called the Cincinnati Time Store at the corner of 5th and Elm Streets in what is now downtown Cincinnati, where trade was facilitated by notes backed by a promise to perform labor: "All the goods offered for sale in Warren's store were offered at the same price the merchant himself had paid for them, plus a small surcharge, in the neighborhood of 4 to 7 percent, to cover store overhead". The store proved successful and operated for three years after which it was closed so that Warren could pursue establishing colonies based on mutualism. These included Utopia and Modern Times. Warren said that Stephen Pearl Andrews' The Science of Society, published in 1852, was the most lucid and complete exposition of Warren's own theories.

Energy credits 

The theory that all values can be evaluated in terms of joules. In the same vein as the labor theory of value, this is an attempt to make a normative basis for value by accounting for embodied energy. Accounting for such a system would be vastly more complex than current or other theoretical currency systems because all energy output of workers and energy expenditure on goods/services must be tracked (something that is thought impossible and useless by many anarchists).

One group that has advocated a system using energy is the technocracy movement with a system based on energy accounting where energy is used to "buy" a product or service without being exchanged, so the effect is that products or services are distributed to the user without gain by the provider (who has the same amount of energy in his or her account regardless) so allegedly making profit impossible.

Workers issues and anarcho-syndicalism 

Anarcho-syndicalism is a branch of anarchism which focuses on the labour movement. Syndicalisme is a French word, ultimately derived from the Greek, meaning "trade unionism"—hence, the "syndicalism" qualification. Syndicalism is an alternative co-operative economic system. Adherents view it as a potential force for revolutionary social change, replacing capitalism and the state with a new society democratically self-managed by workers.

The basic principles of anarcho-syndicalism are workers' solidarity, direct action and workers' self-management. Anarcho-syndicalists believe that only direct action—that is, action concentrated on directly attaining a goal as opposed to indirect action, such as electing a representative to a government position—will allow workers to liberate themselves. Moreover, anarcho-syndicalists believe that workers' organizations (the organizations that struggle against the wage system, which in anarcho-syndicalist theory will eventually form the basis of a new society) should be self-managing. They should not have bosses or "business agents"; rather, the workers should be able to make all the decisions that affect them themselves.

Rudolf Rocker was one of the most popular voices in the anarcho-syndicalist movement. He outlined a view of the origins of the movement, what it sought and why it was important to the future of labor in his 1938 pamphlet Anarcho-Syndicalism. The International Workers' Association is an international anarcho-syndicalist federation of various labor unions from different countries. The Spanish Confederación Nacional del Trabajo (CNT) played and still plays a major role in the Spanish labor movement. It was also an important force in the Spanish Civil War.

Anarcho-syndicalists seek to abolish the wage system, regarding it as "wage slavery" and state or private ownership of the means of production, which they believe lead to class divisions. Not all seek to abolish money per se. Ralph Chaplin states that "the ultimate aim of the General Strike as regards wages is to give to each producer the full product of his labor. The demand for better wages becomes revolutionary only when it is coupled with the demand that the exploitation of labor must cease".

Additionally, anarcho-syndicalists regard the state as a profoundly anti-worker institution. They view the primary purpose of the state as being the defence of private property and therefore of economic, social and political privilege, even when such defence denies its citizens the ability to enjoy material independence and the social autonomy which springs from it. In contrast to other bodies of thought (Marxism–Leninism being a prime example), anarcho-syndicalists deny that there can be any kind of workers' state, or a state which acts in the interests of workers, as opposed to those of the rich and powerful. Reflecting the anarchist philosophy from which it draws its primary inspiration, anarcho-syndicalism holds to the idea that power corrupts.

Although anarcho-syndicalism originated close to the beginning of the twentieth century, it remains a popular and active school of anarchism today and has many supporters as well as many currently active organizations. Anarcho-syndicalist trade unionists, being social anarchists, vary in their points of view on anarchist economic arrangements from a collectivist anarchism type economic system to an anarcho-communist economic system.

Concept of wage slavery 

Wage slavery refers to a situation perceived as quasi-voluntary slavery, where a person's livelihood depends on wages, especially when the dependence is total and immediate. It is a negatively connoted term used to draw an analogy between slavery and wage labor by focusing on similarities between owning and renting a person. The term "wage slavery" has been used to criticize economic exploitation and social stratification, with the former seen primarily as unequal bargaining power between labor and capital (particularly when workers are paid comparatively low wages, e.g. in sweatshops) and the latter as a lack of workers' self-management, fulfilling job choices and leisure in an economy. The criticism of social stratification covers a wider range of employment choices bound by the pressures of a hierarchical society to perform otherwise unfulfilling work that deprives humans of their "species character" not only under threat of starvation or poverty, but also of social stigma and status diminution.

The exchange of money and debt for work traces back to the disintegration of the "playful" work in hunter-gatherer gift economies and the establishment of prostitution as a "fundamental feature of human civilization". Similarities between wage labor and slavery were noted in ancient Rome by Cicero while the pervasive practice of voluntary slavery in Medieval Russia indicates the previous historical coexistence of slavery and voluntary choice. Before the American Civil War, Southern defenders of African American slavery invoked the concept of wage slavery to favorably compare the condition of their slaves to workers in the North. With the advent of the Industrial Revolution, thinkers such as Proudhon and Marx elaborated the comparison between wage labor and slavery in the context of a critique of societal property not intended for active personal use while Luddites emphasized the dehumanization brought about by machines. Emma Goldman famously denounced wage slavery by saying: "The only difference is that you are hired slaves instead of block slaves".

The introduction of wage labor in 18th-century Britain was met with resistance—giving rise to the principles of syndicalism. Historically, some labor organizations and individual social activists have espoused workers' self-management or worker cooperatives as possible alternatives to wage labor.

Collectivizations and workers control 

Workers' control is a term meaning participation in the management of factories and other commercial enterprises by the people who work there. It has been variously advocated by anarchists, socialists, communists, social democrats and Christian democrats and has been combined with various socialist and mixed economy systems. Workers' councils are a form of workers' control.

For Proudhon, mutualism involved creating "industrial democracy", a system where workplaces would be "handed over to democratically organised workers' associations [...] We want these associations to be models for agriculture, industry and trade, the pioneering core of that vast federation of companies and societies woven into the common cloth of the democratic social Republic". He urged "workers to form themselves into democratic societies, with equal conditions for all members, on pain of a relapse into feudalism". This would result in "[c]apitalistic and proprietary exploitation, stopped everywhere, the wage system abolished, equal and just exchange guaranteed". Workers would no longer sell their labour to a capitalist but rather work for themselves in co-operatives.Council communism, such as in the early Soviet Union advocated workers' control through workers councils and factory committees. Syndicalism advocates workers' control through trade unions. Guild socialism advocates workers' control through a revival of the guild system. Participatory economics represents a recent variation on the idea of workers' control.

Workers' control can be contrasted to control of the economy via the state such as nationalisation and central planning (see state socialism) and private control of the means of production as found in capitalism. A worker cooperative is a cooperative owned and democratically managed by its worker-owners. This control may be exercised in a number of ways. A cooperative enterprise may mean a firm where every worker-owner participates in decision making in a democratic fashion, or it may refer to one in which managers and administration is elected by every worker-owner and finally it can refer to a situation in which managers are considered and treated as, workers of the firm.

In traditional forms of worker cooperative, all shares are held by the workforce with no outside or consumer owners and each member has one voting share. In practice, control by worker owners may be exercised through individual, collective or majority ownership by the workforce, or the retention of individual, collective or majority voting rights (exercised on a one-member one-vote basis). A worker cooperative therefore has the characteristic that the majority of its workforce own shares, and the majority of shares are owned by the workforce.

Nevertheless, anarcho-communism has been critical of workers ownership of large means of production for the following reasons: "Whereas the syndicalist alternative re-privatizes the economy into "self-managed" collectives and opens the way to their degeneration into traditional forms of private property – whether "collectively" owned or not – libertarian municipalism politicizes the economy and dissolves it into the civic domain. Neither factory or land appear as separate interests within the communal collective. Nor can workers, farmers, technicians, engineers, professionals, and the like perpetuate their vocational identities as separate interests that exist apart from the citizen body in face-to-face assemblies. "Property" is integrated into the commune as a material constituent of its libertarian institutional framework, indeed as a part of a larger whole that is controlled by the citizen body in assembly as citizens – not as vocationally oriented interest groups".

Forms of exchange 
Anarchist economist Kevin Carson manifests that "[l]ocal currencies, barter networks and mutual credit‐clearing systems are a solution to a basic problem: a world in which there is a lot of work to be done, but there is simply no money around to bring the people and the work together".

Alternate currency 

An alternative currency is any currency used as an alternative to the dominant national or multinational currency systems (usually referred to as national or fiat money). Alternative currencies can be created by an individual, corporation, or organization, they can be created by national, state, or local governments, or they can arise naturally as people begin to use a certain commodity as a currency. Mutual credit is a form of alternative currency and thus any form of lending that does not go through the banking system can be considered a form of alternative currency.

When used in combination with or when designed to work in combination with national or multinational fiat currencies they can be referred to as complementary currency. Most complementary currencies are also local currencies and are limited to a certain region. Barters are another type of alternative currency. These are actually exchange systems, which only trade items; thus without the use of any currency whatsoever. Finally, local exchange trading system is a special form of barter which trades points for items. One point stands for one man-hour of work and often there are issues related to paying tax. Some alternative currencies are considered tax-exempt, but most of them are fully taxed as if they were national currency, with the caveat that the tax must be paid in the national currency. The legality and tax status of alternative currencies varies widely from country to country as some systems in use in some countries would be illegal in others.

Labor notes and local exchange trading systems 

Labour notes are an alternative currency based on exchange of hours of labor. Josiah Warren is widely regarded as the first American anarchist. Josiah Warren termed the phrase "Cost the limit of price", with "cost" here referring not to monetary price paid but the labor one exerted to produce an item. Therefore, "[h]e proposed a system to pay people with labour notes indicating how many hours of work they did. They could exchange the notes at local time stores for goods that took the same amount of time to produce".

He put his theories to the test by establishing an experimental "labor for labor store" called the Cincinnati Time Store where trade was facilitated by notes backed by a promise to perform labor. The store proved successful and operated for three years after which it was closed so that Warren could pursue establishing colonies based on mutualism. These included Utopia and Modern Times.

A local exchange trading system (also local employment and trading system or local energy transfer system; abbreviated to LETS or LETSystem) is a locally initiated, democratically organised, not-for-profit community enterprise that provides a community information service and record transactions of members exchanging goods and services by using the currency of locally created LETS Credits. LETS networks use interest-free local credit so direct swaps do not need to be made. For instance, a member may earn credit by doing childcare for one person and spend it later on carpentry with another person in the same network. In LETS, unlike other local currencies, no scrip is issued, but rather transactions are recorded in a central location open to all members. As credit is issued by the network members, for the benefit of the members themselves, LETS are considered mutual credit systems.

Credit and banking 

Anarchist mutualists argued that free banking should be taken back by the people to establish systems of free credit. They contend that banks have a monopoly on credit, just as capitalists have a monopoly on land. Banks are essentially creating money by lending out deposits that do not actually belong to them, then charging interest on the difference. Mutualists argue that by establishing a democratically run mutual savings bank or credit union, it would be possible to issue free credit so that money could be created for the benefit of the participants rather than for the benefit of the bankers. Individualist anarchists noted for their detailed views on mutualist banking include Pierre-Joseph Proudhon, William Batchelder Greene and Lysander Spooner. Some modern forms of mutual credit are LETS and the Ripple monetary system project.

In a session of the French legislature, Proudhon proposed a government-imposed income tax to fund his mutual banking scheme, with some tax brackets reaching as high as 33 percent and 50 percent, which was turned down by the legislature. This income tax Proudhon proposed to fund his bank was to be levied on rents, interest, debts and salaries. Specifically, Proudhon's proposed law would have required all capitalists and stockholders to disburse one sixth of their income to their tenants and debtors and another sixth to the national treasury to fund the bank. This scheme was vehemently objected to by others in the legislature, including Frédéric Bastiat; the reason given for the income tax's rejection was that it would result in economic ruin and that it violated "the right of property". In his debates with Bastiat, Proudhon did once propose funding a national bank with a voluntary tax of 1%. Proudhon also argued for the abolition of all taxes.

American mutualist William Batchelder Greene is best known for the works Mutual Banking, which proposed an interest-free banking system. In 1850 and 1851, he organized citizens of Brookfield, Warren and Ware, Massachusetts, to petition the state's General Court for a charter to establish a mutual bank: "Upon all the petitions, the Committee on Banks and Banking, after hearing the arguments of the petitioners, reported simply, "Leave to withdraw!" (The Radical Deficiency of the Existing Circulating Medium 1857). Similar attempts by the New England Labor Reform League in the 1870s met with similar results. Greene's mutualist banking ideas resembled those of Proudhon as well as the "land banks" of the colonial period. He had an important influence on Benjamin Tucker, the editor of the anarchist journal Liberty.

During the episode known as the Spanish Revolution, contemporary anarchist theorist Peter Gelderloos reports the following:

Gift economy 

In anthropology and the social sciences, a gift economy (or gift culture) is a mode of exchange where valuable goods and services are regularly given without any explicit agreement for immediate or future rewards (i.e. no formal quid pro quo exists). Ideally, voluntary and recurring gift exchange circulates and redistributes wealth throughout a community and serves to build societal ties and obligations. In contrast to a barter economy or a market economy, social norms and custom governs gift exchange, rather than an explicit exchange of goods or services for money or some other commodity.

Traditional societies dominated by gift exchange were small in scale and geographically remote from each other. As states formed to regulate trade and commerce within their boundaries, market exchange came to dominate. Nonetheless, the practice of gift exchange continues to play an important role in modern society. One prominent example is scientific research, which can be described as a gift economy.

Contrary to popular conception, there is no evidence that societies relied primarily on barter before using money for trade. Instead, non-monetary societies operated largely along the principles of gift economics and in more complex economies on debt. When barter did in fact occur, it was usually between either complete strangers or would-be enemies.

The expansion of the Internet has witnessed a resurgence of the gift economy, especially in the technology sector. Engineers, scientists and software developers create open-source software projects. The Linux kernel and the GNU operating system are prototypical examples for the gift economy's prominence in the technology sector and its active role in instating the use of permissive free software and copyleft licenses, which allow free reuse of software and knowledge. Other examples include file-sharing, the commons and open access.

Anarcho-communists advocate a gift economy as an ideal, with neither money, nor markets, nor central planning. This view traces back at least to Peter Kropotkin, who saw in the hunter-gatherer tribes he had visited the paradigm of "mutual aid". Anarchist anthropologist David Graeber in his 2011 book Debt: The First 5000 Years argues that with the advent of the great Axial Age civilizations the nexus between coinage and the calculability of economic values was concomitant with the disrupt of what Graeber calls "human economies" as found among the Iroquois, Celts, Inuit, Tiv, Nuer and the Malagasy people of Madagascar among other groups, which according to Graeber held a radically different conception of debt and social relations based on the radical incalculability of human life and the constant creation and recreation of social bonds through gifts, marriages and general sociability.

The author postulates the growth of a "military-coinage-slave complex" around this time, through which mercenary armies looted cities and human beings were cut from their social context to work as slaves in Greece, Rome and elsewhere in the Eurasian continent. The extreme violence of the period marked by the rise of great empires in China, India and the Mediterranean was in this way connected with the advent of large-scale slavery and the use of coins to pay soldiers, together with the obligation enforced by the state for its subjects to pay its taxes in currency. This was also the same time that the great religions spread out and the general questions of philosophical enquiry emerged on world history—many of those directly related, as in Plato's Republic, with the nature of debt and its relation to ethics.

Free shops 

Give-away shops, freeshops, or free stores are stores where all goods are free. They are similar to charity shops, with mostly second-hand items—only everything is available at no cost. Whether it is a book, a piece of furniture, a garment or a household item, it is all freely given away, although some operate a one-in, one-out type policy (swap shops). The free store is a form of constructive direct action that provides a shopping alternative to a monetary framework, allowing people to exchange goods and services outside of a money-based economy.

The anarchist 1960s countercultural group The Diggers opened free stores which simply gave away their stock, provided free food, distributed free drugs, gave away money, organized free music concerts, and performed works of political art. The Diggers took their name from the original English Diggers led by Gerrard Winstanley and sought to create a mini-society free of money and capitalism.

Although free stores have not been uncommon in the United States since the 1960s, the freegan movement has inspired the establishment of more free stores. Today the idea is kept alive by the new generations of social centres, anarchists and environmentalists who view the idea as an intriguing way to raise awareness about consumer culture and to promote the reuse of commodities.

Peer-to-peer 

Peer-to-peer (P2P) is not restricted to technology, but covers every social process with a peer-to-peer dynamic, whether these peers are humans or computers. Peer-to-peer as a term originated from the popular concept of P2P distributed application architecture that partitions tasks or workloads between peers. This application structure was popularized by file sharing systems like Napster, the first of its kind in the late 1990s.

The concept has inspired new structures and philosophies in many areas of human interaction. P2P human dynamic affords a critical look at current authoritarian and centralized social structures. Peer-to-peer is also a political and social program for those who believe that in many cases, peer-to-peer modes are a preferable option. Anarchist scholar Uri Gordon has said that "the collaborative development of free software like the Linux operating system and applications such as OpenOffice clearly approximate an informational anarchist communism. Moreover, for anarchists it is precisely the logic of expropriation and electronic piracy that enables a radical political extension of the cultural ideals of the free manipulation, circulation and use of information associated with the "hacker ethic" (Himanen 2001). The space of illegality created by P2P (peer-to-peer) file-sharing opens up the possibility, not only of the open circulation of freely-given information and software as it is on the Internet today, but also of conscious copyright violation. The Internet, then, enables not only communist relations around information, but also the militant contamination and erosion of non-communist regimes of knowledge—a technological "weapon" to equalise access to information, eating away at intellectual property rights by rendering them unenforceable".

P2P is a specific form of relational dynamic, based on the assumed equipotency of its participants, organized through the free cooperation of equals in view of the performance of a common task, for the creation of a common good, with forms of decision-making and autonomy that are widely distributed throughout the network. There are three fundamental aspects of social P2P processes:
 Peer production: the collaborative production of use value is open to participation and use to the widest possible number (as defined by Yochai Benkler, in his essay Coase's Penguin).
 Peer governance: production or project is governed by the community of producers themselves, not by market allocation or corporate hierarchy.
 Peer property: the use-value of property is freely accessible on a universal basis; peer services and products are distributed through new modes of property, which are not exclusive, though recognize individual authorship (i.e. the GNU General Public License or the Creative Commons licenses).

Peer production does not produce commodities for exchange value, and does not use the price mechanism or corporate hierarchy to determine the allocation of resources. It must therefore be distinguished from both the capitalist market (though it can be linked and embedded in the broader market) and from production through state and corporate planning; as a mode of governance it differs from traditional linear hierarchies; and as a mode of property it differs from both traditional private property and state-based collective public property; it is rather the common property of its producers and users and the whole of humankind. Unlike private property, peer property is inclusive rather than exclusive—its nature is to share ownership as widely, rather than as narrowly as possible.

While many anarcho-communists are opposed to trade, some post-left, post-scarcity anarcho-communists and ones with syndicalist sympathies are not opposed to trade. Some support a non-monetary form of trade in the form of post-monetary trade unions and commons. Others such as Tiziana Terranova easily see anarcho-communism being compatible with a non-hierarchical, open access, free association, post-monetary form of trade such as P2P.

Coexistence of economic systems and economic pluralism 

French anarchist without adjectives Max Nettlau addressed the issue of the coexistence of different economic systems as follows: 

French individualist anarchist Émile Armand argued for a pluralistic economic logic when he said: "Here and there everything happening – here everyone receiving what they need, there each one getting whatever is needed according to their own capacity. Here, gift and barter – one product for another; there, exchange – product for representative value. Here, the producer is the owner of the product, there, the product is put to the possession of the collectivity".

At the time of the Spanish Revolution led by the anarcho-syndicalist trade union CNT and by the FAI, the issue of the coexistence of different economic systems was addressed. Daniel Guérin in Anarchism: From Theory to Practice reports the following:

Commune, federalism and economic democracy 

Anarcho-communism has been critical of a simple call for worker's ownership of workplaces and their administration as cooperatives. Murray Bookchin has put it this way "what of the syndicalist ideal of "collectivized" self-managed enterprises that are coordinated by like occupations on a national level and coordinated geographically by "collectives" on a local level?...Here, the traditional socialist criticism of this syndicalist form of economic management is not without its point: the corporate or private capitalist, "worker-controlled" or not – ironically, a technique in the repertoire of industrial management that is coming very much into vogue today as "workplace democracy" and "employee ownership" and constitutes no threat whatever to private property and capitalism...In any case, "economic democracy" has not simply meant "workplace democracy" and "employee ownership." Many workers, in fact, would like to get away from their factories if they could and find more creative artisanal types of work, not simply "participate" in "planning" their own misery. What "economic democracy" meant in its profoundest sense was free, "democratic" access to the means of life, the counterpart of political democracy, that is, the guarantee of freedom from material want. It is a dirty bourgeois trick, in which many radicals unknowingly participate, that "economic democracy" has been re-interpreted as "employee ownership" and "workplace democracy" and has come to mean workers' "participation" in profit sharing and industrial management rather than freedom from the tyranny of the factory, rationalized labor, and "planned production", which is usually exploitative production with the complicity of the workers".

A common call within anarchism is for a confederal form in relationships of mutual aid and free association between communes as an alternative to the centralism of the nation-state. Peter Kropotkin thus suggested: "Representative government has accomplished its historical mission; it has given a mortal blow to court-rule; and by its debates it has awakened public interest in public questions. But to see in it the government of the future socialist society is to commit a gross error. Each economic phase of life implies its own political phase; and it is impossible to touch the very basis of the present economic life – private property – without a corresponding change in the very basis of the political organization. Life already shows in which direction the change will be made. Not in increasing the powers of the State, but in resorting to free organization and free federation in all those branches which are now considered as attributes of the State".

As such, "no community can hope to achieve economic autarchy, nor should it try to do so unless it wishes to become self-enclosed and parochial, not only "self-sufficient." Hence the confederation of communes—the Commune of communes—is reworked economically as well as politically into a shared universe of publicly managed resources. The management of the economy, precisely because it is a public activity, does not degenerate into privatized interactions between enterprises; rather it develops into confederalized interactions between municipalities. That is to say, the very elements of societal interaction are expanded from real or potential privatized components to institutionally real public components. Confederation becomes a public project by definition, not only because of shared needs and resources. If there is any way to avoid the emergence of the city-state, not to speak of self-serving bourgeois "cooperatives", it is through a municipalization of political life that is so complete that politics embraces not only what we call the public sphere but material means of life as well".

Economic democracy as proposed by Takis Fotopoulos and Bookchin is a socioeconomic philosophy that proposes to shift decision-making power from corporate shareholders to a larger group of public stakeholders that includes workers, customers, suppliers, neighbors and the broader public. No single definition or approach encompasses economic democracy, but most proponents claim that modern property relations externalize costs, subordinate the general well-being to private profit and deny the polity a democratic voice in economic policy decisions. In addition to these moral concerns, economic democracy makes practical claims, such as that it can compensate for capitalism's claimedly inherent effective demand gap.

Proponents of economic democracy generally argue that modern capitalism tends to hinder or prevent society from earning enough income to purchase its output production. Corporate monopoly of common resources typically creates artificial scarcity, resulting in socio-economic imbalances that restrict workers from access to economic opportunity and diminish consumer purchasing power. Economic democracy has been proposed as a component of larger socioeconomic ideologies, as a stand-alone theory and as a variety of reform agendas. For example, as a means to securing full economic rights, it opens a path to full political rights, defined as including the former. As a reform agenda, supporting theories and real-world examples range from decentralization to democratic cooperatives, fair trade and the regionalization of food production and currency.

Examples of anarchist economies 

Utopia, sometimes known as Trialville, was an individualist anarchist colony begun in 1847 by Josiah Warren and associates in the United States on a tract of land approximately 30 miles from Cincinnati. Another example of individual anarchists attempting to put their economic theories into action was the Cincinnati Time Store, where labor notes were redeemable for goods.

The anarchist collectives formed during the Spanish Civil War are the most famous example of an anarchist economy operating on a large scale. The collectives were formed under the influence of the anarcho-syndicalist union (the CNT) in rural and urban areas and successfully practised workers' self-management and collectivist anarchism for a number of years in extremely difficult economic and political circumstances. Other examples of self-management include the factory committee movement during the Russian Revolution and the workplace occupations in Argentina during its crisis at the turn of the 21st century. Attempts at forming co-operatives also appeared during the Paris Commune of 1871 and the Italian factory occupations of 1920.

See also 
 Autonomism
 Community-based economics
 Decentrally planned economy
 Distributism
 Gandhian economics
 Political economy
 Prosumer
 Socialist economics

References

Sources

Further research

Anarchist economics bibliography 
 
 Albert, Michael, Parecon: Life After Capitalism (W. W. Norton & Company, April 2003). 
 Albert, Michael, Thinking Forward: Learning To Conceptualize Economic Vision (1997)
 Albert, Michael, Moving Forward: Program for a Participatory Economy (2001)
 Albert, Michael, Realizing Hope: Life beyond Capitalism (2006)
 Alexander Berkman, What is Communist Anarchism?, Prison Memoirs of an Anarchist, others
 Murray Bookchin, Post-Scarcity Anarchism (1971 and 2004). 
 Carson, Kevin, Studies in Mutualist Political Economy (BookSurge Publishing, 2007). 
 Kevin A. Carson, The Iron Fist behind the Invisible Hand: Corporate Capitalism As a State-Guaranteed System of Privilege (Nanaimo, BC: Red Lion 2001, revised 2002)
 Kevin A. Carson, Contract Feudalism: A Critique of Employer Power Over Employees (London: Libertarian Alliance 2006)
 Gary Chartier. The Conscience of an Anarchist (2011) Apple Valley, California: Cobden Press. . 
 
 Dolgoff, Sam, editor, The Anarchist Collectives: Workers' Self-Management in the Spanish Revolution (Montreal: Black Rose Books). 
 Dolgoff, Sam The Relevance of Anarchism to Modern Society (Chicago: Charles H. Kerr, 1989).
 
 Fotopoulos, Takis, Towards An Inclusive Democracy (Online, 11MB) (Cassell/Continuum, London/New York, 1997). 
 Fotopoulos, Takis, "The Multidimensional Crisis and Inclusive Democracy", Athens 2005.
 
 
 Graeber, David. 
 Guillen, Abraham. Anarchist Economics: An alternative for a world in crisis. The economics of the Spanish Libertarian Collectives 1936-39 DAM & La Presa. 1992.
 Hahnel, Robin. The ABC's of Political Economy (Pluto, 2002)
 Hahnel, Robin. Economic Justice and Democracy (Routledge, 2005)
 Kropotkin, Peter Fields Factories and Workshops (The Collected Works of Peter Kropotkin, V. 9) (Black Rose Books, 1 January 1996). 
 Kropotkin, Peter Anarchist Communism: Its Basis and Ideals
 Kropotkin, Peter The Conquest of Bread (New York: New York University Press).
 Leval, Gastón Collectives in the Spanish Revolution (London: Freedom Press). 
 G. P. Maximoff, Program of Anarcho-Syndicalism. (extract from his Constructive Anarchism, published in English in 1952; this section is not included in the only edition of the work now in print.) (Sydney: Monty Miller Press, 1985).
 Proudhon, Pierre, The System of Economic Contradictions, or The Philosophy of Poverty
 Proudhon, Pierre What Is Property? (B. Tucker, translator). (Cambridge University Press). 
 
 Solidarity Federation and IWA. The Economics of Freedom: An anarcho-syndicalist alternative to capitalism . SolFed Booklets. 2003
 Various authors. The Accumulation of Freedom: Writings on Anarchist Economics. AK Press. (2012)

Articles 
 "Anarchist Economics" by Anarcho
 "The Economics of Anarchy" by Anarcho
 Anarchism and Economics article by Terry Phillips (in favour of a mixed economy)
 Archive of anarchist economic articles at the Anarchist Library
 Anarchist Economics compiled by Jon Bekken (overview of the topic with extensive reading lists from Syndicalist.org).
 Open Source Currency – article by Douglas Rushkoff on The Feature Archives
 The Future of Payment Systems – discussion paper by Bernard Lietaer (the chapter on Complementary Currency Systems starts on page 23)
 Economics Kiosk at Infoshop.org
 Institute for Social Ecology
 Parecon.org – information on participatory economics
 Panarchy About panarchy, voluntarism and aterritorialism
 Anarchist Economics PDF from Invisible Molotov

Extensive sections of An Anarchist FAQ on economics 
 Section B – Why do anarchists oppose the current system?
 Section C – What are the myths of capitalist economics?
 An Anarchist FAQ – Section D – How does statism and capitalism affect society?
 *I.4 How could an anarchist economy function?
 I.3 What could the economic structure of anarchy look like?

Films 
 Vivir la utopía – Living Utopia   by Juan Gamero 1997. (About Anarchism in Spain and the Collectives in the Spanish Revolution).
 "Anarchist Economics" Workshop presented at the Mobilizing and Organizing From Below Conference in Baltimore, Maryland, June 1-3, 2012

 
Anarchist theory
Issues in anarchism